Downs Explorer (originally known as Southern Downs Steam Railway) was founded in 1996, initially to restore the former Queensland Railways locomotive depot in Warwick.

In 2000, a C17 class steam locomotive was purchased and restored to operational condition with passenger operations commencing in January 2009.

The museum regularly operates services on the Southern line from Warwick to Toowoomba and Wallangarra. It is an all-volunteer railway.

See also

List of heritage railways in Australia

References

External links
Downs Explorer

Railway museums in Queensland
Warwick, Queensland
1996 establishments in Australia
Tourist railways in Queensland